Masillastega ("Messel roof") is an extinct aquatic bird from the Eocene of Germany. It is related to modern gannets and boobies, but unlike these birds it occurred in freshwater environments. It was found in the lake that would become the Messel Pit.

References
 G. Mayr. 2002. A skull of a new pelecaniform bird from the Middle Eocene of Messel, Germany. Acta Palaeontologica Polonica 47(3):507-512

Prehistoric bird genera
Sulidae
Eocene birds of Europe
Fossil taxa described in 2002